One Hour Late is a 1934 American comedy film directed by Ralph Murphy and written by Kathryn Scola and Paul Gerard Smith. The film stars Joe Morrison, Helen Twelvetrees, Conrad Nagel, and Arline Judge. One Hour Late was released on December 14, 1934, by Paramount Pictures. The film was intended as a vehicle to help Morrison become a new Paramount star.

Plot

Cast
Joe Morrison as Eddie Blake
Helen Twelvetrees as Bessie Dunn
Conrad Nagel as Stephen Barclay
Arline Judge as Hazel
Ray Walker as Cliff Miller
Eddie Craven as Maxie
Toby Wing as Maizie
Gail Patrick as Mrs. Ellen Barclay
Edward Clark as Mr. Meller
Ray Milland as Tony St. John
George E. Stone as Benny
Jed Prouty as Mr. Finch
Arthur Hoyt as Barlow
Charles Sellon as Simpson

References

External links 
 

1934 films
Paramount Pictures films
American comedy films
1934 comedy films
Films directed by Ralph Murphy
American black-and-white films
Films with screenplays by Kathryn Scola
1930s English-language films
1930s American films